Mood Swings is an album by Koby Israelite released in 2005 on Tzadik.

Track listing 
 "Dror Ikra" - 3:03
 "Return of the Idiots" - 2:19
 "It Is Not a War Here" - 7:05
 "Ethnometalogy" - 5:08
 "Europa?" - 2:49
 "Hiriya On My Mind" - 4:53
 "12 Bar (Mitzvah) Blues" - 4:34
 "For Emily" - 6:23
 "No Room for Anarchy" - 3:26
 "Goodbye Unit 26" - 3:32
 "Mood Swings / Smile" - 5:12
 "Psychosemitic" - 4:32

Personnel 
 Banjo - Koby Israelite (tracks: 1, 2, 4, 9, 10)
 Bass - Yaron Stavi (tracks: 1, 3, 4, 5, 7, 8, 10 to 12)
 Clarinet - Gilad Atzmon (tracks: 4, 6, 7, 10, 11), Koby Israelite (tracks: 1 to 3, 5, 7 to 9), Tigran Aleksanyan (tracks: 4)
 Guitar - Koby Israelite (tracks: 1, 3 to 9, 12)
 Keyboards - Koby Israelite (tracks: 3, 4, 6 to 9, 11, 12)
 Mastered By - Scott Hull (2)
 Mixed By - Bill Laswell (tracks: 10 to 12), Koby Israelite (tracks: 1 to 9), Ophir Star (tracks: 1, 2, 4, 6, 7)
 Producer, Composed By, Arranged By, Recorded By, Accordion, Drums, Percussion - Koby Israelite
 Recorder [Duduk] - Tigran Aleksanyan (tracks: 1, 3, 8)
 Saxophone - Gilad Atzmon (tracks: 7, 8, 11)
 Tuba - Oren Marshall (tracks: 2, 7)
 Viola - David Lasserson (tracks: 1, 9, 10)
 Violin - Marcel Mamaliga (tracks: 3, 12)
 Vocals - Koby Israelite (tracks: 1, 5, 8, 12)

References 

2005 albums
Koby Israelite albums